Henry Thomas (Harry) Blyth (1852–1898) was a British writer who also wrote under the pen-name Hal Meredith. Blyth was born in Greenwich, London.  He wrote for many of Alfred Harmsworth's papers of the 1890s, and is mostly remembered for creating detective Sexton Blake.

Life and work

As a freelance writer and journalist Blyth started out writing about food. His Eat, Drink and be Merry; or Dainty Bits from many Tables was published by J. A. Brook and Co in 1876. Of it, the Bookseller wrote: "This is not a Cookery book, but a gossip about all sorts of Cookery, from real turtle to snails; all sorts of drinks, from Champagne to small beer eau-de-voie to nettle tea; with anecdotes culled from all sources, and presented with the sauce of a true literary caterer."  It was followed by a series of food articles entitled Snacks for the Hungry, in the Tattler, then in 1879 by Magic Morsels: Scraps from an Epicure's Table, Gathered, Garnished and Dished by Harry Blyth, published by T.H. Roberts and Co of London.

In 1879, Mr Blyth's life story was told in an early number of the Biograph, a monthly magazine devoted to contemporary biography.

In 1880 he started an illustrated weekly in Edinburgh called the Archer. It folded after the first issue. Of the experience he wrote: "I printed it on green paper partly because of the title, but mainly to give the eyes of my readers a rest. They rested so well that they never saw the type, and were too sleepy to want the second number. This, I believe, was the first attempt made in Great Britain to give newspaper readers absolute repose."

In 1883 he co-founded The Chiel with Robert Arthur (who built the Kennington Theatre), a Scottish Punch-style paper based in Glasgow. It ran for 363 issues, from 17 February 1883, to 25 January 1890.

In 1884 he was editor of Cream o' the North, a paper published by the Savoy Publishing company.
In 1887 he published The Secret of Sinclair's Farm of which the critics spoke quite well. It was subsequently serialized in various newspapers. The following year his novel The Queen of the Air was published by the North British Publishing Company, a company Blyth owned, to very positive reviews. A reviewer in Fun wrote "This is one of the thrilling romances by a deservedly popular author, now in course of publication, and is worthy of wide circulation."

In 1889 he became editor of Waverly, a literary, dramatic and fictional paper where he also wrote a column entitled "The New Mysteries of London, or The Old Bailey" where he 'cleared up many mysteries.'   In 1890 he edited a new weekly paper called Romance   He also had an interest in the theatre and wrote a very successful pantomime for the Theatre Royal, Glasgow.

In 1893, after writing a series of thirteen articles entitled Third Class Crimes for The Sunday People, he came to the attention of publisher Alfred Harmsworth who was looking for writers to contribute to his newly launched boys' periodicals. The story goes that when publisher and author met for the first time, Harmsworth greeted Blyth by saying: "So you are the crime merchant?", to which Blyth replied: "Just as you are the newspaper merchant."  Harmsworth who was always impressed by people who stood up to him, commissioned him to write adventure and detective stories for The Halfpenny Marvel.

Blyth made his debut in The Halfpenny Marvel #2 with The Gold Fiend under the pen-name Hal Meredeth. It was followed by a tale under his own name, The Black Pirate, in issue #4, a swashbuckler that may have been the inspiration for the movie starring Douglas Fairbanks of the same name a few decades later.

He created Sexton Blake in The Missing Millionaire which ran in issue #6. The sequel A Christmas Crime ran in issue #7, both to popular success. Blyth published these tales under the name Hal Meredth, the surname being his mother's maiden name. He wrote prolifically for the Amalgamated Press papers over the next four years, under his pen-name and his own name, in Pluck, Popular, Chums and the Union Jack.

He died of typhoid fever in February, 1898, aged only 46. His passing was widely reported. His obituary in the North Devon Journal (Barnstaple, England) on 10 February read:

The death is announced of Mr. Harry Blyth, editor of The Chiel, Glasgow. Deceased was the younger brother of Dr. Wynter Blyth, the famous analyst, who some years ago resided at Barnstaple, and was then the Medical officer of Health for a group of North Devon Unions. Deceased had a great liking for amateur theatricals, and during his residence in Barnstaple often appeared on the boards at the Barnstaple Theatre. He organised a local histrionic club, which lasted until he himself left the town. After he left Barnstaple he took to journalism in many of its varied forms, being especially clever and witty in his humorous productions. He was also considered an authority on food, and among the books written by him are "Magic Morsels, Scraps for the Hungry, and Eat, Drink, and be Merry.

The libel case of 1888

Blyth was known for his humour and it got him into trouble once. As reported in the Glasgow Herald, 20 April 1888.

Action for Alleged Libel

In the Court of Queen's Bench, London, yesterday, Mr Justice Hawkins and a special jury were engaged in hearing the case Marks v. Blyth. The plaintiff claimed damages for a libel published by the defendant, who pleaded that he had made an apology and paid £10 into Court to satisfy Mr. Marks's demand. Mr Kisch was the counsel representing the plaintiff, whilst Mr. Kergp, Q.C., Mr. Horace Browne, and Mr Lynn appeared for the defendant.

The plaintiff, it appears, is a journalist, and has done work for the Times, the Morning Post, and other journals both in this country and abroad. In October of last year a publication was about to appear called the Society Herald, which was to be devoted to financial, theatrical, literary, and other matters. Of that journal Mr. Marks was the editor-elect. The defendant, Mr. Harry Blyth, is the editor and proprietor of a weekly serio-comic paper called the Chiel, which circulates in and about Glasgow, and in this publication he published on 22 October the paragraph complained of. It ran thus:—"London is threatened with a new society journal, which is to be called the Society Herald. The editor is said to be used to cakumpicking, and the staff, I am told, consists of criminal lawyers and pugilists." The attention of the defendant was called to the statements contained in the libel, all of which Mr. Marks denied, and on 10 December—six weeks after the publication—an apology was inserted. The question was whether the £10 paid into Court, coupled with the apology, was sufficient compensation. Mr Blyth, the plaintiff, was called in support of his case. No other evidence was called.

Mr. Kemp addressed the jury for the defence, Mr. Blyth was, he said, absolutely unacquainted with the identity of the plaintiíf and his staff. The paragraph in question was a stupid joke, for which a humble apology had been offered. Taking the circumstances into consideration, he submitted that the £10 paid in was enough.

Mr. Kisch, replying, contended that the statements made constituted about as serious and scandalous and unjustifiable a libel as could be published. He asked for substantial damages.

Mr. Justice Hawkins having summed up, the jury retired to consider their verdict. They returned into Court after a short absence, when the foreman said that they found for the plaintiff for £10 paid into Court.

Mr. HORACE BROWNE—Upon that finding I ask your lordship to enter judgment for the defendant, and to certify for a special jury. The claim was for £1000.

Mr. Justice HAWKINS—I will reserve my judgement. In the meantime, I will ask the jury some further questions. (To the jury)—Are you of opinion that the libel was inserted without malice or gross negligence?

The FOREMAN—Yes.

Mr. Justice HAWKINS—Did the defendant insert the apology at the earliest opportunity?—No.

Mr. Justice HAWKINS—Do you consider the apology a full one?—Yes.

Mr. Justice HAWKINS—You find that the sum paid into Court is enough to satisfy the claim?—Yes.

Mr. Justice HAWKINS—Don't let the ten pounds dwell in your minds at all. Just ask yourselves this question—Having regard to all the circumstances, if no money had been paid in, what would you say would be the right amount of damages to award the plaintiff ?—None at all. (Laughter.)

Mr. Justice HAWKINS—That puts a different complexion upon the matter.

Mr. KISCH—Is that the unanimous verdict of the jury?

A JUROR—No.

Mr. Justice HAWKINS—What is your unanimous verdict?

A JUROR—How small a sum can we give?

Mr. Justice HAWKINS—Well, gentlemen, I can amend the record and make the claim for a million instead of a thousand, and then you can give any sum between a farthing and a million inclusive. (Laughter.)

Eventually the jury assessed the damages at one farthing.

Mr. Justice HAWKINS—You find that the plaintiff, if he cannot get the £10, is to have a farthing?

The FOREMAN—Yes.

Mr. KISCH—I apply for judgement.

Mr. Justice HAWKINS—I enter judgment for you for the damages which the jury have found namely, a farthing.

Mr. BROWNE asked his Lordship—Supposing the verdict for a farthing was an ultimate one to deprive the plaintiff of his costs?

Mr Kisch protested.

Mr Justice HAWKINS—You consider it a Scotch joke. (Laughter.) Whether the plaintiff is entitled to any or what costs will be decided at the proper time.

Judgement entered for the plaintiff—damages a farthing.

Sexton Blake

Harry Blyth was paid £9.9 for the full rights to the first Sexton Blake story, the name, and the character. He wrote seven Blake stories in total.

 The Halfpenny Marvel #6: The Missing Millionaire as Hal Meredeth 
 The Halfpenny Marvel #7: A Christmas Crime as Hal Meredeth 
 The Halfpenny Marvel #11: A Golden Ghost; or, Tracked by a Phantom as Harry Blyth
 The Halfpenny Marvel #33: Sexton Blake's Peril! as Hal Meredeth 
 The Union Jack 1st Series #2: Sexton Blake; Detective as Harry Blyth
 The Union Jack 1st Series #15: Sexton Blake's Triumph! as Hal Meredith 
 The Union Jack 1st Series #194: 'Twixt Gallows and Gold as Anon

Blyth had originally given Blake a partner, French detective Jules Gervaise, his senior and mentor. Gervaise disappeared after the first few stories and starred in his own solo tale The Accusing Shadow in 1894. Perhaps noting the success of Sexton Blake, Blyth created his own detective, Gideon Barr, to whom he retained the rights. Barr's career, however, was short-lived, comprising just five tales. He made his last appearance in Christmas Clues, the first Sexton Blake/Nelson Lee crossover, a story he co-wrote with Maxwell Scott.

Blyth's Blake stories, though they included traditional crimes like theft and murder, also had the detective engage with master criminals, gangs and conspiracies. Blake faced "The Red Lights of London" in The Missing Miliionaire
"The Slaughterer" in Sexton Blake's Triumph, "The Terrible Three" in Sexton Blake's Peril and "the Zeefri" in The Golden Ghost.

Influence
Blyth's work, though now mostly forgotten, had a largely hidden influence on later writers. The conspiracy scenes of The Accusing Shadow (1894) anticipate similar, later scenes in G.K. Chesterton's The Man Who Was Thursday, Agatha Christie's The Secret of Chimneys, and Dorothy L. Sayers' The Cave of Ali Baba. Run to Earth features Mrs. Pink, one of the earliest fictional female criminal masterminds. The ending of the story foreshadows Arthur Conan Doyle's ending in The Adventure of the Illustrious Client, written almost 30 years later.

Selected bibliography 
 Eat, Drink and be Merry; or Dainty Bits from Many Tables, 1876.
 Christmas Story of London Low Life, 1876
 Tinged with Blood, 1877
 Shattered, 1878
 The Bloom o' the Heather, 1878
 Snacks for the Hungry, The Tatler, 1879
 Magic Morsels: Scraps from an Epicure's table, 1879
 Silverflake, 1879
 Tom Tilsit, 1879
 When the Clock Stopped, 1879
 A Wily Woman, 1879
 As the Snow Fell, 1879
 Amongst Thieves or a Fatal valentine, 1879
 The Old Bailey. An Historical Romance, 1879
 Just a Queen, 1880
 Sweet Kate of Kinross!, 1880
 The Crimson Shadow, 1881
 Done in the Snow or Topsy Darling's Danger, 1881
 Paying His Way, 1882
 Twibell's Trip, A Holiday Story, 1882
 In the Nick of Time, 1882
 Clear as day, A Matter of Circumstantial Evidence, 1882
 To Her Heart's Content, 1882
 Heart for Heart, 1882
 Black Mail, 1883
 The Life of a Rogue, 1883
 A Tale of Sin and Sorrow
 The Love of a Life, 1883
 Snatched from Death
 Done in the Dark, 1883
 Harry Blyth's Christmas Annual, 1886
 A Comic History of Glasgow. By Bailie Islay, Junior. Illustrated, 1886 
 A Narrow Squeak, 1887
 Like a Thief in the Night, 1887 
 Helen Jegado, Maid-of-All Work, 1887
 The Secret of Sinclair's Farm, 1888
 The Handy Guide Book to the History, Antiquities, Buildings, Streets, and Surroundings of Dunfermline
 A Fearful Fortune, 1890
 My Sweetheart!: The Life and Adventures of Minnie Palmer
 A Christmas Fantasy, 1892
 Secrets of the London Squares
 Secrets of the London Streets, 1893
 Her Darling Foe, 1894

Third Class Crimes (1893)
 A Bermondsey Burglary
 The Price of a Putney "Pub"
 A Marriage Marred at Margate
 High Play at Highbury
 The Forged Bill and the Brighton Belle
 A Cruel Trick at Teddington
 The Biter Bit at Bayswater
 Left Behind at Barnes
 Love at Loughboroug Park
 The Pale Woman at Peckham
 A Man's Husband's Wife of Wimbledon
 Called to Account at King's Cross
 Trying it on at Tooting

The Old Bailey: Celebrated Trials Retold (1894)
 The Abergele Accident
 Illness of the Prince of Wales
 The Franco-Prussian War
 The Shah's Visit
 The Tichborne Trial
 The Loss of the Northfleet
 The Balham Mystery

The Halfpenny Marvel
 The Halfpenny Marvel #02 The Gold Fiend (as Hal Meredeth)
 The Halfpenny Marvel #04 The Black Pirate
 The Halfpenny Marvel #06 The Missing Millionaire (as Hal Meredeth)
 The Halfpenny Marvel #07 A Christmas Crime (as Hal Meredeth)
 The Halfpenny Marvel #23 Brought to Bay. A tale of lynch law (as Hal Meredeth)
 The Halfpenny Marvel #24 The Horrors of Siberia; or, Across the Roof of the World
 The Halfpenny Marvel #36 Silver Camp: A Story of Wild Life in California
 The Halfpenny Marvel #42 The Lone Islander
 The Halfpenny Marvel #48 The Accusing Shadow
 The Halfpenny Marvel #53 The Last of the Crew: Being the Adventures of the Sole Survivor of the Good Ship Tyne

The Union Jack
 The Union Jack 1st Series #2: Sexton Blake; Detective as Harry Blyth
 The Union Jack 1st Series #5: The White Slaver
 The Union Jack 1st Series #8: The Magic Island
 The Union Jack 1st Series #15: Sexton Blake's Triumph! as Hal Meredith
 The Union Jack 1st Series #16: The Bear Hunters
 The Union Jack 1st Series #22: The Hunt of the Walrus; or, King of the Frozen North
 The Union Jack 1st Series #194: 'Twixt Gallows and Gold as Anon

Pluck
 Pluck #02 Heroes of the Matabele War
 Pluck #05 Fighting the Fire or the Fireman's Secret
 Pluck #18 Brought to Justice or Gideon Barr's Secret
 Pluck #26 Hunted Down (Gideon Barr)
 Pluck #27 The Hero of Herat
 Pluck #33 The King of the Whalers
 Pluck #42 Run to Earth Or, Gideon Barr's Terrible Chase
 Pluck #46 Policeman Paul, the Hero of the Force
 Pluck #50 Diver Dick, or Under the Seas
 Pluck #56 Christmas Clues with Maxwell Scott 
 Pluck #54 The King of the Steeplejacks
 Pluck #64 With Spear and Shell: A Story of the Zulu War
 Pluck #67 Policeman Paul
 Pluck #73 Jim Sandford The Signalman: A Hero of the Line
 Pluck #81 Mid Unseen Foes: The Story of Cecil Roman, King of the Ring
 Pluck #141 Brave Parley the Pilot

The Big Budget
Big Budget #1 From Toil to Triumph, 1897

In the Eye of the Law: Short Stories (1897)
 A Doctor's Downfall, 1897
 A Wolf Among the Flock, 1897
 A Gifted Slavey, 1897
 The Sin, the Sorrow, The Crime, 1897
 The Bottle, the Sovereign, and the Strange Man, 1897
 The Moneylender's Revenge, 1897
 Married to a Gorner, 1897
 A Perfect Lady, 1897
 A Rogue and His "Monkey", 1897
 Dr. Budd's Blunder, 1897
 The Terror of Her Life, 1897
 Old Rueben's Daughter, 1897
 My Body to the Hounds, 1897
 The Butler's Revenge, 1897
 A Cloud in the Sky, 1897
 Waiting for the Verdict, 1897
 The Transformation of Mr. Dunn 1897
 A Novelist's Eclipse, 1897 
 Rescued from Durance, 1898

Chums
Chums #278-294 Hunji the Hindoo, 1898

Funny Wonder
 Strange Stories of Dark Deeds, Being Narratives of Actual Facts Collected from the Police Records of Europe
 The Terrible Three

Stage Play
Our Great Surprise, 1891 (A pantomime piece in one act)

New Collections 
 The Secret of Sinclair's Farm,  British Library, Historical Print Editions, 2011
 The Sexton Blake Casebook (1987) Includes The Missing Millionaire with original illustrations
 Victorian Tales of Mystery and Detection: An Oxford Anthology, 1992
 Vintage Mystery and Detective Stories, 1998. Includes The Accusing Shadow
 Sexton Blake: The Missing Millionaire a rewriting by Joseph Lovece. Includes original tale by Harry Blyth, 2015
 Sexton Blake: A Christmas Crime a rewriting by Joseph Lovece. Includes original tale by Harry Blyth, 2015
 Sexton Blake: The Early Years. ROH Press, 2020. Features the first 5 Sexton Blake cases
 Moriarty's Rivals: 13 Female Masterminds. ROH Press, 2020. Features Mrs. Pink in Run to Earth

Further reading
  Davie, David Stuart (2006) Vintage Mysteries and Detective Stories. Wordsworth Edition page 15 
 Panek, LeRoy Lad (2014) After Sherlock Holmes: The Evolution of British and American Detective Stories 1891-1914 page 53 
 Dictionary of the World's Press 1886, p588
 Wlaschin, Ken (2009) Mystery and Detective Movies: A Comprehensive Filmography. McFarland and Company p250
 Murray, Chris (2017) The British Superhero The University Press of Mississippi
 Peach, Linden (2006) Masquerade, Crime and Fiction: Criminal Deceptions. Palgrave page 84

References

External links
 Victorian Tales of Mystery and Detection at Archive.org
 Preview for Christmas Clues, the first Sexton Blake & Nelson Lee crossover tale written by Harry Blyth and Maxwell Scott.
 Harry Blyth Bibliography at The FictionMags Index
 Union Jack #2 Sexton Blake Detective at ComicBooksPlus
 The Secret of Sinclair's Farm December, 1887, The Cardiff Times
 The Old Bailey Advertisement, Cardiff Times, 4 December 1889 
 Third Class Crimes Advertisement, Cardiff Times, 13 June 1893 
 Harry Blyth's IMDb page

English crime fiction writers
1852 births
1898 deaths
British boys' story papers
British male novelists
19th-century English male writers
Authors of Sexton Blake